= Sitel (Bolivian TV channel) =

Bolivian television network

Sociedad Integral de Televisión, better known as Sitel, is a Bolivian semi-national over-the-air commercial television network.

== History ==
Sitel was created on June 18, 1999 at the initiative of Enrique Roda Busch, and broadcast on a network led by a UHF station in La Paz. One of its staff members, Yara Abastoflor Barberich, was assassinated in 2000. On March 14, 2005, its staff entered a hunger strike due to a lack of pay.

On March 5, 2007, the network started airing a sports news program presented by Roberto “Quico” Birbuet Alarcón.

The station in 2011 spent 212,000 bolivianos in the carriage of advertising from the governments of several municipalities of Santa Cruz Department.

For the Carnaval season of 2013, it aired Y que viva el carnaval, in the month leading up to the event.

The network's staff was unable to film footage during the coup attempt on June 26, 2024.
